Archdall is a surname. Notable people with the surname include:

 Audley Archdall (1826–1893), Irish born cricketer
 Esther Archdall (1916–1999), New Zealand artist
 Henry Archdall (1886–1976), Australian academic and clergyman
 Mervyn Archdall (disambiguation)
 
The family name can also be spelled Archdale.